Vernon Rylands Parton (2 October 1897 – 31 December 1974) was an English chess enthusiast and prolific chess variant inventor, his most renowned variants being Alice chess and Racing Kings. Many of Parton's variants were inspired by the fictional characters and stories in the works of Lewis Carroll. Parton's formal education background, like Lewis Carroll's, was in mathematics. Parton's interests were wide and he was a great believer in Esperanto.

Parton's early education stemmed from his father's schools, where he also assisted. Parton's father was principal of Cannock Grammar School and a small international boarding school for children. After completing mathematics at Chester Teaching College, Parton returned to his father's school to give private instruction to older children in Latin, French, German, English, shorthand, typing, bookkeeping, and mathematics. In the 1920s he was left in charge of the school while his father returned to teach in state schools. Ill health cut short Parton's teaching career.

In 1960 Parton moved from Cannock to Liverpool, into a terraced house near Penny Lane, and published a series of nine monographs from 1961 to 1974 (also 1975 posthumously) detailing his inventions. He died from emphysema at age 77 in Liverpool on 31 December 1974. The same year, variant inventor Philip M. Cohen created the variant Parton Chess in his honour.

Some chess variant inventions

Cubic chess

In this 6×6×6 3D variant by Parton, boards are denoted A (bottom level) through F (top level). Each side has six pieces: king (K), queen (Q), bishop (B), unicorn (U), knight (N), and rook (R); and twelve pawns.

Game rules
Pieces move the same as in Raumschach, except that pawns move and capture one step forward (either orthogonally, diagonally, or vertexally), but not directly upward or downward.  As in chess and Raumschach, the objective is checkmate.
White's starting setup: KAa1, QAb1, BAc1, UAd1, NAe1, RAf1; pawns on Aa2–f2 and Ba1–f1
Black's starting setup: KAf6, QAe6, BAd6, UAc6, NAb6, RAa6; pawns on Aa5–f5 and Ba6–f6

Variation
Parton made a variation of cubic chess for the same gameboard: In compulsion cubic chess, capture is compulsory, there are no checks, and the object is capture of the opposing king.

Alice chess
 

Parton's most famous chess variant, played on two adjacent chessboards. A piece that completes its move on one board automatically "vanishes strangely off its board to appear suddenly on the other board, magically out of thin air!" A move in Alice chess has two basic stipulations: the move must be legal on the board on which it is played, and the square transferred to on the opposite board must be vacant. (Consequently, capture is possible only on the board upon which a piece currently stands.)

From D. B. Pritchard's Popular Chess Variants (2000): This wonderful game, appropriately named after Lewis Carroll's eponymous heroine, was the inspiration of Vernon Parton. If you pass over every other game in this book, don't miss this one. Still, alas, little known, Alice chess, now almost a half-century old, continues to attract converts. The body of Alice players grows steadily.

Mad Threeparty chess

This variant is for three players on a 10×10 board. Each player has a standard set of pieces in his own colour, including an extra  but no pawns.

Game rules
The board starts empty. Players take turns, in clockwise rotation around the board, placing one of their pieces on any vacant square. Kings are placed last, but must not be placed in check.

The two kings of each player are marked differently. (For example, of a player's two kings, one might be marked with a star.) Each player attacks the marked king of the opponent to his left, and the unmarked king of the opponent to his right. It is not permitted to check the opponents' other kings.

The first player to checkmate a king wins the game.

Tweedle chess

Also known as twin orthodox chess or double-king chess, each player has two kings and two queens on a 10×10 board. A player wins by checkmating either one of the opposing kings.

Game rules
The normal chess rules apply, except that kings and rooks can only castle "short" (i.e. with kings shifting two squares toward the nearest corner), and pawns can move one or two steps at any stage.

Comments
"While his pair of Queens will provide the player's main hopes for victory, his twin monarchs King Tweedledee and King Tweedledum jointly provide his sequence of headaches!"  Parton makes note that the only way a player can escape mate from a fork on his two kings is by capturing the checking piece.

Boyer remarked that the variant yields "magnificent games" because there are two directions of attack and two points to defend.

March Hare chess

Game rules
For each turn, a player makes two moves: he first moves one of his own pieces, then one of his opponent's men.

When a player is in check, he must get out of check immediately on his turn by moving one of his own men. (If he cannot legally do so, he loses the game.)

Cheshire Cat chess

Game rules
In this variant, all normal chess rules apply, except: Whenever a piece moves from its square, then that particular square must at once get out of the chessboard.

Parton suggests using checker pieces to mark "disappeared" squares. Once vanished, a square may not be occupied again; however, pieces may move through disappeared square(s), including giving check through them.

Since castling is impossible in Cheshire Cat Chess (pieces which normally clear a path for castling cause needed squares to "disappear"), Parton permits the kings to be moved like queens once per game, on their first move.

Variation
The game can also be played using a regular 8×8 board and set, but Parton suggests the 10×10 board with two extra rooks in the corners as "best".

Co-regal chess

In this variant, the queens are subject to check and checkmate the same as kings.

Game rules
Checkmate of the opponent's king or queen wins the game. The queen moves and captures as a normal queen, but may not put itself in check. The queen may pass over attacked squares.

Amplified rules by NOST

A queen, the result of a pawn promotion, is royal. A queen may check a king from a distance, but may not check a queen. Both kings and queens may castle .

Comments 
"It will be seen that difficulties for a 'checkmate' of the hostile Queen must chiefly arise from her great mobility which enables her to escape to safety with some degree of ease, in contrast with the King's poor slow power to move out of grave dangers. Victory in Co-regal will be in general achieved by checkmate of the enemy King. [...] A player must acquire two new habits at least. He must crush all his desires to make some brilliant Queen sacrifice. When he attacks the hostile co-regal Queen, he is obliged to give the polite word 'check' as warning!"

Sample game
Walter Whiteman vs. Rib Orrell: 1.e4 Nf6 2.Nc3 e5 3.Nf3 Bc5 4.Bc4 Ng4 5.0-0 Nxf2+ 6.Rxf2 Bxf2+ 7.Kxf2 0-0 8.d3 d6 9.Ng5 Be6 10.Bxe6 fxe6+ 11.Ke1 h6 12.Nxe6+ Qh4+ 13.g3+ Qxh2  "Black threatens 14...Qg/h1 mate since a K move is illegal as it exposes the Q to check. If 14.Qg4 (only legal move for Q) Rf2 15.Ne2 (forced: Qxg7 is not mate—it's illegal!) Rxe2+ and mate in three."

Racing Kings

This game was the original Dodo chess before being renamed. The rules are the same as Dodo chess.

Sample game
R. Betza vs. J. Leitel: 1.Bd4 Be4 2.Kh3 Ka3 3.Nxc1 Rxc1 4.Be2 Nb3 5.Bh8? Ka4 6.Kg4 Ka5 7.Qh6 Rc6 8.Qe3 Rxe2 9.Qxe4 Qxh8? 10.Qxc6 Qc3 11.Qh6 Rxe1 12.Rxe1 Qxe1 13.Kf5 Qe7 14.Qe6 Qb7 15.Kg6 Nc5 16.Qf7 Ka6 17.Kh7 Ka7 18.Rg8 (18.Kg8 only draws) 

Parton suggests also that play can be extended to a "double course", where a player wins by being first to go to the eighth rank and then return to the first.

Dodo chess

Played on a regular chessboard, this variant is a simple race game: the first player to reach a square on the last  with his king is the winner.

Game rules
Checking is not permitted, neither is exposing one's own king to check. Captures are allowed, however, as in normal chess.

"By way of compensating for the first move (always an advantage in a race game) if White gets there first but Black follows on the next move the game is a draw."

Kinglet chess

Also known as imperial fiddlesticks, there is no checking or checkmate in kinglet chess – kings are treated like any normal piece. The winner is the first player to capture all the opponent's kinglets (i.e. pawns or Fiddlesticks).

Additional rules
When reaching the last rank, a kinglet promotes to a king. If a player is forced to promote his last kinglet, he is then without any kinglets so automatically loses. All pieces including kings are subject to capture. Stalemate is a draw.

Comments
"The idea contains some interesting problems in tactics.  The balance between rushing to capture Fiddlesticks [pawns] quickly and fear of becoming defenceless thereby, (loss of major pieces) seems to be subtle and delicate."

Variations
Parton suggests two "less subtle" variations in Curiouser and Curiouser, one based on Progressive chess where players make an increasing number of moves per turn, and the other based on Marseillais chess where players move two pieces per turn, at least one of which must be a kinglet (or, the same kinglet may be moved twice).

Looking-glass chess

Two separate games ensue in this Parton creation. A player may make any normal move on either board, and then must make the 'looking-glass' (reflected) move on the other board to complete his turn.

Game rules
To illustrate, if White opens with 1.Nf3 on board A, then he must play 1.Nc3 on board B to complete his turn (see diagram). If a reflected move would put the player in check, then the first move may not be made.

The move of a king or queen must be mirrored on the other board, even if this means moving the king several squares. (For example, in the diagram if White captures 2.Nxe5/A Nxd5/B and Black recaptures 2...Qxd5/B, then Black's reflected move is: 2...Kxe5/A.)

Castling is normal, but then the reflected move must be executed to 'castle' the queen. (E.g. if White castles kingside, then reflected queenside castling results in the queen on b1 and the rook on c1.)

Gryphon chess

Also known as complicacious chess, at the end of a move, the moved piece transforms to a piece of a different type (the next in the series: pawn→knight→bishop→rook→queen→king). So after moving a pawn, the pawn transforms to a knight of the same colour. After moving a knight, it becomes a bishop; and so on. Kings do not transform.

Game rules
A player may have no more than four knights, four bishops, four rooks, or two queens on the board at any one time, but may have as many as fifteen kings. Checkmating any one of the enemy kings wins the game.

Comments
"It will be seen at once that a complicacious pawn reaches the status of kingship in five moves, whereas a complicacious Rook does so in two moves. [...] Naturally, a player will not capture the enemy Queen! Neither will he desire to move his own Queen, to provide the necessary target for his opponent to win by."

Variations

In circular Gryphon chess, players have one king for the entire game as in normal chess. But the transformation sequence is changed and made circular: pawn→knight→bishop→rook→queen→pawn. (So, a piece can transform any number of times without limitation.) Again, no more than four knights, four bishops, four rooks, or two queens are permitted in play at any one time.

In simplified Gryphon chess, players start with their king and eight pawns. "The pawns change through the regular Gryphon order and terminate in kingship. Until a player has captured an enemy piece, he is forbidden to move his king sideways or backwards."

Mock chess

To win the game, a player must capture all his opponent's pieces, including the king. "A proper pseudomorph to Chess, for it has no elements of check and mate whatever in its basis. Kings are now merely treated like any other chessman."

Game rules
If a player can capture, he must do so. If more than one capture are possible on his turn, he may choose which one to make. Only one capture per turn may be made.

On its first move, a pawn must advance two squares—unless the pawn's first move is a capture.

Contramatic chess

The normal rules for check and checkmate are contradicted—a player may not check the enemy king, but may move his own king into check. A player wins when his opponent cannot escape giving check.

Game rules
Players start with kings positioned as shown. White places his remaining pieces anywhere he likes on his side of the board, then Black does the same. White moves first.

Checking the opponent is not allowed. (If a player has no move other than to give check, then he loses.) A player may make a move putting his own king in check from enemy piece(s)—unless the move would also give check to the opponent. When a player is in check, his opponent must remove the check on his next turn or lose the game.

Observations
Kings tend to move more than any other piece. Kings cannot occupy adjacent squares, since it would result in giving check to the opponent (in violation of the rules). Captures are rare, since capturing the opponent's men reduces the chance of putting one's own king in check.

Variation 
In Complete Contramatic chess (also known as C.C.C.) each player has two kings – a normal (orthodox) king in addition to the regular "contramatic" king. There are two ways to win: putting one's own contramatic king into inescapable check, or checkmating the enemy orthodox king. Players place the orthodox kings last, after other pieces are placed.

Observations
A contramatic king can move to a square adjacent to the enemy orthodox king (since the orthodox king may be checked as in normal chess, and the contramatic king may put itself into check). But an orthodox king may not move adjacent to the enemy contramatic king (since it is not allowed to check an opponent's contramatic king, or to put one's own orthodox king into check).

Idle Kings' chess

Game rules
Players play without kings until after Black's 12th move, when White places his king on any open square (but not in check), and Black does the same.

Additional rule
After kings are placed the game continues normally, except that kings may not move, unless in check.

Unirexal chess

Also known as The Black King's Complaint, Unirexal variants are those with only one king on the board. "The black king disappeared, explains Parton, because he was fed up with always being mated in problems."

Game rules
Black has a second queen instead of a king, and must checkmate White in a reasonable number of moves (agreed to before the game), otherwise White wins.

Variation

Black has 20 knights, but no king. If Black does not checkmate White within 50 moves, he loses.

Decimal Rettah chess

This is Parton's first chess variant invention. The idea sprang from a dislike for weak kings: "The king ought to be strong, not feeble, by aesthetic standards: he is the centre around which turns the whole game itself. In consequence, my Rettah monarch is the most powerful of all pieces." 

Each player has two rettahs (kings) and two queens on a 10×10 board. There is no checkmate; a player wins by capturing both opponent's rettahs.

Game rules
A rettah [hatter spelled backwards] moves and captures as a Q+N compound. If a rettah is attacked, the attacking piece must be captured immediately. (If more than one piece is able to capture, the player may choose. An attacked rettah will always have the option to capture.) If a rettah is attacked by two pieces simultaneously, the attacked rettah must capture one of them (the player may choose which).

Pawns can move up to three steps on their first move. There is no en passant. If players agree, pawns can also move one step diagonally forward (to facilitate opening lines). A pawn promotes to rettah, but only if a rettah of the same colour was previously captured. There is no castling in Decimal Rettah.

Variations
Parton gives several variations, although Decimal Rettah is "possibly the earlier version and arguably the better"  . In Absolute Rettah chess, only a rettah may capture a rettah. (So a successful tactic involves attacking a rettah with a piece guarded by one's own rettah.) In Giveaway Rettah, Decimal or Absolute Rettah are played according to Suicide chess rules. In Rettah chess (one rettah; pawns move only one step forward) and Double Rettah chess (two rettahs; no forced capture; win by checkmating a rettah), play is on a regular 8×8 board.

Sample game
Decimal Rettah, "a game of assault and sacrifice", received high praise from Boyer who published the following sample game [the game uses an alternate initial setup NBKQRRQKBN and incorrect interpretation of the capture rule, requiring that only a rettah may capture its attacker]:

1.c3 f6 2.Qb3 Rf8 3.Qxb9+ Kxb9 4.Bf5+ Kxf5 5.e4+ Kxe4 6.f3+ Kxf3 7.Rxf3 Qc6 8.Rh3 Qxc3+ 9.Kxc3 Rc8+ 10.Kxc8 dxc8 11.Qc5 e7 12.Rxh9+ Kxh9 13.Qh5+ Kxh5 14.Ni3+ Kxi3 15.Kxi3 1–0

Identific

In this variant, the identity of chess pieces becomes known as play proceeds.

Game rules
Players first place their 12 counters (draughtsmen) on any squares of their choosing on their own half of the board. (Either White places all his counters first, followed by Black; or one per turn if the players prefer.)

After all counters have been placed, White moves any one of his counters as a regular chess piece of his choosing, then immediately replaces that counter with the corresponding chess piece. Black does similarly on his turn. These "moves of identification" obey the following rules: 

 
After each player has identified one chess piece, on subsequent turns players may choose to identify an additional piece from those still in-hand, or move one of their chess pieces already on the board. Chess pieces move, capture, give check/checkmate as normal, and may capture enemy counters.

A player's fourth identified piece must be his king. (Or the players can agree on a different schedule, for example, the sixth identified piece.) Players might also want to prevent the early identification of queens, for example, by requiring at least five identifications, or by limiting identification of queen to a player's last-remaining counter.

Synchronistic chess

"A variant designed, part tongue-in-cheek, to achieve absolute equality." 
"[...] to eliminate altogether that inequality between White and Black, by the simple idea that White and Black shall always play their corresponding moves simultaneously!"

Game rules
For each turn players decide their moves, write them down secretly, then disclose them. They adjust the position accordingly, using the following rules of resolution when needed:

In Synchronistic Chess, simultaneous checkmate is possible.

Damate

Also known as Damate Game, the game is a synthesis between draughts and chess.

Game rules
A king has no  and is considered a normal ; a player wins by eliminating all the opponent's men. The pieces move normally, except that pawns have no initial two-step option, and besides their normal one-step move straight forward, can move one step diagonally forward. A piece captures an enemy piece by jumping it: 

As in draughts, jumping is always mandatory, multi-jumps are possible, and the multi-jump chosen must capture the maximum number of pieces possible. (If more than one jumping sequence captures the maximum, the player may choose.) The pieces captured in a multi-jump are not removed from the board until the end of the turn.

A pawn promotes to queen when it crosses the centre line of the board. A pawn jumping over the centre line both promotes and immediately ends the turn (i.e. no further jumps are allowed).

Dunce's chess

 
Also known as Advancing chess, the game has simple rules: Moves, captures, and checks are restricted to straight forward or diagonally forward directions. (Sideways or backwards is not permitted.) Pawns do not promote. The game is won by checkmating or stalemating the opponent.

Variations

Semi-queen chess

Also known as half-queen's chess, the game introduces two additional pawns and two new pieces per side, the "ugly-named Biok and Roshop".

Game rules
The Biok makes non-capturing moves like a bishop, and captures like a rook. The Roshop makes non-capturing moves like a rook, and captures like a bishop.

As a result, the Roshop "has the great advantage of being able to change from one colour system of squares to the other when required" .

Variation
{{Chess diagram 10x10 small
 |tright
 | 
 |rd|md|ed|bd|qd|kd|bd|ed|md|rd
 |pd|pd|pd|pd|nd|nd|pd|pd|pd|pd
 |  |  |  |  |  |  |  |  |  |  
 |  |  |  |  |  |  |  |  |  |  
 |  |  |  |  |  |  |  |  |  |  
 |  |  |  |  |  |  |  |  |  |  
 |  |  |  |  |  |  |  |  |  |  
 |  |  |  |  |  |  |  |  |  |  
 |pl|pl|pl|pl|nl|nl|pl|pl|pl|pl
 |rl|ml|el|bl|ql|kl|bl|el|ml|rl
 |<small>Semi-queen chess extension</small>
}}
Parton defines an extension having no additional pawns and a pair of Bioks and Roshops per player.

Black and White chess

 
Also known as Black and White Marseillais chess, this game follows a simple rule: each player makes two moves per turn, first with a  standing on a white (light) square, then with a man standing on a black (dark) square. Some resolutions are provided:
 
Castling can be done on either the first or second move of a turn. A man can be moved twice in a turn if square colour requirements are met. (For example, with a white pawn on a2 and a black bishop on b4, White's turn can consist of a3 followed by axb4.)   

List of game inventions

Chess variants

 Checkers chess (1950s) 
 Decimal four-handed chess (1950s) 
 Idle Kings' chess (1950s) 
 Nightrider chess (1950s) 
 Scaci Partonici (1950s)
 Decimal Rettah chess (1952) 
 Double Rettah chess (1952)
 Parton's Game (1952)
 Rettah chess (1952)
 Tweedle chess (or Twin Orthodox chess) (1952) 
 Alice chess (1953)
 Kinglet chess (or imperial fiddlesticks) (1953) 
 Neutral King chess (1953)
 No-retreat chess (1954), co-inventor J. Boyer
 Black and White chess (or Black and White Marseillais chess) (1955) 
 Ecila (1957 or earlier) 
 Degraded chess (1958)
 Complete contramatic chess (1961)
 Contramatic chess (1961)
 Damate (1961)
 Racing Kings (1961) 
 Dunce's chess (or advancing chess) (1961)
 Gryphon chess (or complicacious chess) (1961)
 Jabberwocky chess (1961)
 Knightmare chess (1961) 
 Linear chess (1961)
 March Hare chess (1961)
 Royal Scaci Partonici (1961) 
 Scacia (1961) 
 Simpleton chess (or Simpletonry) (1961)
 Twin chess (1961)
 Unirexal chess (or The Black King's Complaint) (1961)
 Chimaera chess (1969)
 Mock chess (1969) 
 Ambi-chess (1970) 
 Best decimal butter (1970)
 Blot-straight chess (1970)
 Butters (1970)  
 Capricorn chess (1970) 
 Centaur Royal (1970)
 Cheshire Cat chess (1970)
 Co-regal chess (1970) 
 Cubic chess (1970)
 Demigorgon chess (1970)
 Dodo chess (1970)
 Gorgona chess (1970) 
 Identific (1970) 
 Looking-glass chess (1970)
 Mad Threeparty chess (1970) 
 Meddlers' chess (1970) 
 Semi-queen chess (or half-queen's chess) (1970) 
 Sphinx chess (1970) 
 Timur's cubic chess (1970) 
 Wyvern chess (1970)
 Circean (1971) 
 Dabbabante chess (1971) 
 Decimal Oriental chess (1971) 
 Imitante Queen chess (1971) 
 Synchronistic chess (1971) 
 2000 A.D. (1972)
 Royal Fury (1972)
 Gorgon chess (1973) 
 Megasaur chess (1973) 
 Mimotaur chess (1973) 
 Rangers chess (1973)
 Triscacia (1974)

Draughts variants

 Alician Draughts (1956)
 Damate (1961)
 Dragon Kinger, Simple Kinger, and Grand Kinger ScoundrelsOther games
 SalterelloMonographs (with section headings)Curiouser and Curiouser (1961), 31 pp.
 Scacetic
 The First Lesson in Chess
 Dunce's Chess in Three Grades
 Imperial Fiddlesticks
 The Queen's Relations
 The Dodo's Chess
 Rettah
 Simpletonry
 Alician
 The Black King's Complaint
 Tweedledee and Tweedledum
 Mock Turtle's Pseudomorphy
 Damification
 A New Pudding
 Podospherism
 Contramatic
 The Rules According to the March Hare
 Knightmares
 Gryphon's Fancy and Fun
 The Realm of Circum Morus
 The Caterpillar's Idea of C.C.C.Challenge and Delight of Chessical and Decimal (1970), 14 pp.Chesshire-Cat-Playeth Looking-Glass Chessys (1970) Part I, 14 pp.
 The Queen of Hearts' Chess
 Capricorn Chess
 The Black King's Complaint
 The Rules According to the March Hare
 Identific
 Synchronistic Chess
 Jabberwocky Chess
 Dodo ChessChesshire-Cat-Playeth Looking-Glass Chessys (1970) Part II, 13 pp.
 The Chesshire Cat's Grin
 Scaci Partonici
 A Chess Reflection
 Demigorgons
 The Mad Tea Party
 Knightmares
 Scaci PartoniciChessical Cubism or Chess in Space (1971), 16 pp.
 Cubic Chess
 Tamerlane Variation of Cubic Chess
 Sphinxian Chess
 The Compulsion Sphinx Chess Variations
 Ecila Chess100 Squares for Chess + Damante (1971), 16 pp.
 Capablancan Chess
 Decimal Falcon-Hunter (Schulz Chess)
 Half-Queen's Chess
 Decimal Oriental Chess
 Decimal Imitante Q Chess
 Centaur Royal
 Damate Game
 Damatic Chess
 Decimal Duffer's Chess
 Wyvern Chess
 Dabbabante Chess
 Decimal Butter
 Decimal Obstacles Chess
 Chimaera
 Gorgona
 Circean
 Ambi-Chess
 Decimal Scaci PartoniciMy Game for 2000 A.D. and After (1972), 12 pp.Enduring Spirit of Dasapada (1973), 19 pp.
 DasapadaIdea for a Personal Game (1973), 12 pp.
 The Basis of Pawn Partonici
 The Idea of Scaci PartoniciChessery for Duffer and Master (1974), 23 pp.
 Chessery for Duffer and Master
 The Game of Rettah Chess
 Semi-Queen Chess
 The Diversion of Zerta
 Meddlers Chess Game
 The Alice chess Game
 The Idea of Gryphon Chess
 Royal Fury

Notes

ReferencesBibliographyFurther reading

External links

 Vernon Rylands Parton (1897–1974) by Jean-Louis Cazaux, The Chess Variant Pages
 Alice chess by Edward Jackman and Fergus Duniho, The Chess Variant Pages
 Black and White Chess by Hans Bodlaender, The Chess Variant Pages
 Cheshire Cat Chess by Hans Bodlaender, The Chess Variant Pages
 Kinglet by Hans Bodlaender, The Chess Variant Pages
 Kinglet by Uwe Wiedemann, Zillions of Games
 Racing Kings and Dodo Chess by Hans Bodlaender, The Chess Variant Pages
 Rettah by Vu Q. Vo., The Chess Variant Pages
 Unirexal Chess by Hans Bodlaender, The Chess Variant PagesSimple programs by Ed Friedlander in Java'''

 Alice Chess
 Black and White Chess
 Cheshire Cat Chess
 Contramatic Chess
 Co-Regal Chess
 Dodo Chess
 Gryphon Chess
 Identific
 Idle Kings' Chess
 Kinglet Chess
 Mad Threeparty Chess
 March Hare Chess
 Mock Chess
 Racing Kings
 Rettah Chess
 Simplified Gryphon Chess
 Twin Orthodox (Tweedle) Chess
 Unirexal Chess

1897 births
1974 deaths
British chess writers
Chess variant inventors
People from Cannock
People educated at Cannock Chase High School